Panos Ioannides is one of the most renowned and celebrated living Cypriot novelists and playwrights.

Biography 

Panos Ioannides was born in Famagusta, Cyprus, in 1935. He studied Mass Communications and Sociology in the United States and Canada. He served as Director of Radio and Television Programmes at the Cyprus Broadcasting Corporation. He has been writing literature, mostly prose and theatre, since 1955. Works of his have been translated and published in their entirety or in parts in French, German, Arabic, Japanese, English, Russian, Romanian, Chinese, Hungarian, Polish, Serbo-Croat, Turkish, Persian, Bulgarian, Swedish, Dutch, Spanish, and other languages. His plays Gregory, Peter the First, The Suitcase, and Ventriloquists have been staged in Greece, England, USA and Germany. He served as Chairman of the Cyprus Theatre Organization (ThOK) Repertory Committee, and as President of the Cypriot PEN Centre, the Cyprus chapter of PEN International. He lives in Nicosia, Cyprus.

Works

Prose 

 IN ETHERIAL CYPRUS, short stories, G. Fexis Publications, Athens, 1964
  CYPRUS EPICS, short stories, P.K.I. Publications, Cyprus, 1968 
 KRONAKA, VOLUMES I & II, novellas and short stories, I.M. Publications, Cyprus 1970 and 1972
  CENSUS Απογραφή, novel, I.M. Publications, Cyprus, 1973  Second edition, Ledra Publications, Athens, 1993 
 THE UNSEEN ASPECT, novellas and short stories, Kinyras Publications, Cyprus, 1979
  THREE PARABLES BY NICOLAOS KEYS, JOURNALIST Τρείς Παραβολές, novellas, Kinyras Publications, Cyprus, 1989 
 THE UNBEARABLE PATRIOTISM OF P.F.K. Η Αβάσταχτη Φιλοπατρία του Π.Φ.Κ., novel, Kinyras Publications, Cyprus, 1989  Second Edition, Kastaniotis Publications, Athens 1990 
 SAILING, VOLUMES I & II, novellas and short stories, Alassia Publications, Cyprus 1992
  DEVAS Οι Ντέβα, novel, Armida Publications, Cyprus 2006
  AMERICA '62: De Profundis Αμερική 62: De Profundis, novel, Armida Publications and AIORA PRESS, Cyprus and Greece December 2007
 KOAZINOS Κοάζινος, novel, Armida Publications, Cyprus 2012

Plays 

 THE MAN FROM SALINA, Ο άνθρωπος από την Σαλίνα, Έκδοση περιοδικού «Κυπριακά Χρονικά» 1964, Cyprus 1964 
 PLAYS FROM THE BIBLE, Δραματάκια από τη Βίβλο. Εκδοση Πολίτη, Αθήνα 1970, Athens 1970
 PYGMALION AND GALATIA, Cyprus 1973 
 YOU, WHO DIED FOR THE LIGHT Συ που σκοτώθεις για το φως, Cyprus 1962  Revised edition, Armida Publications, Cyprus 2004  
 THREE PLAYS (The Bath, Ventriloquists, Gregory), Kinyras Publications, Cyprus 1973 
 ONESILUS, Proodos Publications, Cyprus 1981
 THREE ONE-ACT PLAYS (The Suitcase, Dry Martini, Cousins), P.K.I. Publications, Cyprus 1984
  FOTINOS Φωτεινός, Armida Publications, Cyprus 2000 
 MEMORIAL SERVICE, SIMAE Publications, Cyprus 2002
  LEONTIOS AND SMYRNA Λεόντιος και Σμύρνα, Armida Publications, Cyprus 2005

Poetry 

 SONGS OF SHIGERU AND OTHER POEMS, Cyprus 1966
  IN PARENTHESIS Εν Παρενθέσει..., Armida Publications, Cyprus 2000

Anthologies 

  CYPRUS HIGHLIGHTS, with Leonidas Malenis, Cyprus 1963
 ANTHOLOGY OF CYPRIOT SHORT-STORIES, with Andreas Christofides, I.M. Publications, Cyprus 1969 
 ANTHOLOGY OF THE EOKA STRUGGLE, I.M. Publications, Cyprus 1973
 FACE OF AN ISLAND , 24 short stories from Cyprus in English, Armida Publications, Cyprus 1997
  FACE OF AN ISLAND , 25 Cypriot poets translated in English, Armida Publications, Cyprus 2000
  EUROPE IN CYPRIOT PROSE, Bilingual, Armida Publications, Cyprus 2006
  EUROPE IN CYPRIOT ESSAY WRITINGS, Bilingual, Armida Publications, Cyprus 2006

Magazines 

  IN FOCUS , quarterly magazine,  Cyprus PEN Centre DEC 2003 ~

TV and Cinema scenarios 

  GREGORY: Directed by Evis Gavrielides, the televised version was shown by the CyBCTV, TV Greece and other European TV Stations, as well as by the National TV Network of Australia. 
 ASINOU: A documentary on the Chapel of Asinou, directed by Panos Ioannides. This church belongs  to a group of nine Troodos Mountain Churches included in the World Heritage Monuments selected  by UNESCO. The documentary was shown in Cyprus, Greece and other countries. 
 THE TILLYRIA BOMBINGS: Documentary filmed by the writer in Tillyria district, Paphos, during the  bombing of this district of Cyprus by the Turkish air force in 1964. 
 KYRIAKOS MATSIS: Documentary on the life of the hero of the Cyprus liberation struggle, Kyriakos Matsis.
  PETER THE FIRST: Scenario for the historical TV series of eleven, forty-five-minute episodes. The  series was shown in Cyprus and by the CyBC Satellite TV. 
 TROUBLED YEARS: Scenario for a TV series of the same name, in collaboration with Hera Genagritou.  It was shown on MEGA TV, Cyprus.

Translated works 

Works of Panos Ioannides have been translated and published in their entirety or in parts, in various  languages.

  POEMS: French translation of Song for Shigeru and other poems. Translated by Gaston Henry Aufrére,  Edition Subervie, Rodez, France, 1968
  POEMS: Japanese translation of Song for Shigeru and other poems.
  PETROS I ODER DIE BALLADE DER ARODAFNUSSA: Translation of the play «Peter I». It was published in  German in 1987 by Romiosini Publishing House. Translated by Gudrun Rohr, it was staged the  same year by the Cologne Theatre «Comedia». 
  TROIS PARABLES DE NIKOLAOS KEIS - JOURNALIST: Translated by Helen Reboud, the prose book  «Three parables by N. Keys, journalist», was published in a bilingual edition by the University of Nancy, France and the Editions «Praxandre», in 1996.
 THE UNBEARABLE PATRIOTISM OF P.F.K.: The novel was published in Romanian by the Meronia Publishing  House, Bucharest, 2001
  FIVE NOVELAS: KINYRAS, GREGORIOS AND EFTHYMIOS, KING ALEXIS, KYPRIANI, PHOTOGRAPHS, Translated in Bulgaria by Georgi Konstantinov
  AMERICA 62: DE PROFUNDIS, Translated in German by Brigite Munch, Published by Verlag auf dem Ruffel
  AMERICA 62: DE PROFUNDIS, Translated in Turkish by Lale Alatli, Published by Orm and Ruffel
  AMERICA 62: DE PROFUNDIS, Translated in Arabic by Dr. Khaled Raouf, Published by Sefsafa Culture & Publishing
  AMERICA 62: DE PROFUNDIS, Translated in Albanian by Kleo Lati, Published by OMBRA GVG 
  KOAZINOS, Translated in German by Michaela Prinzinger, Published by Verlag auf dem Ruffel
  KOAZINOS, Translated in Arabic by Dr. Khaled Raouf, Published by Sefsafa Culture & Publishing
  KOAZINOS, Translated in Turkish by Lale Alatli, Published by OPM and Ruffel
  KOAZINOS, Translated in Serbian, Published by Karpos Books 
  KOAZINOS, Translated in Albanian by Kleo Lati, Published by OMBRA GVG 
  CENSUS, Translated in English by Despina Pirketti, Published by Armida Publications
  CENSUS, Translated in Lithuanian by Dalia Staponkute, Published by Alma littera 
  DEVAS, Translated in German by Brigite Munch, Published by Groessenwahn Verlag
  DEVAS, Translated in Turkish by Lale Alatli, Published by Orm and Ruffel

Short stories and novellas by Panos Ioannides have been published in the following anthologies  and magazines:

 SHORT STORY INTERNATIONAL, New York, Issues 60, 62 and 98 
 SUDDEN FICTION, World short story anthology, Norton and Co, New York-London, 1992
  THE STORY TELLER, International Prose Anthology, Edition Nelson, Canada, 1992 
 FOREIGN LITERATURE, Cyprus Prose Anthology in Chinese, Beijing 1988
  ZYPRISCHEN MINIATUREN, Romiosini Publications, Cologne, 1987 
 KALIMERHABA, Trilingual Cyprus Prose and Poetry Anthology in German, Greek and Turkish,  Romiosini Publications, Cologne, 1992 
 CIPRUSI GOROG ELBESZELESEK, Cyprus Anthology in Hungarian, Europa Konyukiado Publishing,  Budapest, 1985
  PROSE AND POETRY, Hellenica Chronica Publ., Paris 1993
  GRIEKENLAND AAN ZEE, Anthology of Greek Literature in Dutch, Chimaira Publishing, Groningen, the Netherlands, 2001 
 LITERATURA DE LA ISLA DE CHIPRE, Anthology in Spanish, Universidad de la Playa Ancha,  Chile, 2003 
 GREEK WRITERS TODAY, Volume I, Hellenic Authors Society Publ.

Awards 

He has been awarded five National Prizes for Literature by the Cyprus Ministry of Education and  Culture for his works:
  CYPRUS EPICS, short stories, 1968
 CENSUS, Novel, 1973
 THE UNSEEN ASPECT, short stories, 1979
 THE UNBEARABLE PATRIOTISM OF P.F.K., novel, 1989
 KOAZINOS, novel, 2012
Prizes awarded for his theatrical plays:

 GREGORY, 1st Prize at the 5th International Theatrical Festival, Sofia, 1976 
 ONESILUS, 1st Prize of the Cyprus Society of Playwrights, 1980
  DRY MARTINI, 1st Prize of Cyprus National Theatre Organization, 1984

In 1992 Panos Ioannides was awarded the «Theodosis Pierides and Tefkros Anthias» Prize for his  contribution to Cyprus Literature.
In 2007 he won the highest award given by the Republic of Cyprus to a writer: Excellence in Letters, Arts and Sciences.
In 2009 Panos Ioannides was awarded the «George Philippou Pierides Prize» for his Prose Works, by the Union of Cypriot Writers

Reviews and interviews 

Reviews of his work and interviews are published regularly in the press. The most recent reviews include:
Η τριλογία μιας γεμάτης ζωής - ΠΑΡΑΘΥΡΟ | ΠΟΛΙΤΗΣ
Δύο μυθιστορήματα κι ένας αιώνας ανάμεσά τους (Μέρος Α’) - Αλήθεια Online
Δύο μυθιστορήματα κι ένας αιώνας ανάμεσά τους (Μέρος B’) - Αλήθεια Online
The Short Review - A J Kirby
Αμερική, ένα κατόρθωμα στον τομέα της μυθιστοριογραφίας, περιοδικό Φρέαρ – του Χριστόδουλου Καλλίνου
Ο Πάνος Ιωαννίδης και η αθέατη όψη της Κύπρου - της Φραγκίσκης Αμπατζοπούλου

References

Living people
Cypriot novelists
People from Famagusta District
1935 births